Forrest Winfield McPherson (October 22, 1911 – October 7, 1989) was an American football player (center, guard and tackle). 

McPherson was born in 1911 in Fairbury, Nebraska. He attended the University of Nebraska and made his professional debut in the NFL in 1935 with the Chicago Bears until he was traded to the Philadelphia Eagles the same year. He played for the Green Bay Packers and Philadelphia Eagles over the course of his 10-year career. He also played for the 1938 Los Angeles Bulldogs (Independent,) Los Angeles Dons, Hollywood Bears.  In 1934 he signed with the St Louis Gunners Pro Football Club but did not play with them.  Forrest won a Championship with the Green Bay Packers in 1944 under coach Lambeau.

McPherson had two brothers that played pro football: Elmer out of UCLA and then pro for the New York Giants and Corwin played for the Hollywood Bears. Forrest had two children Forrest Lee McPherson and Diana Lee Rodriguez and he was married two times to Marguerite and Mercedes McPherson.

listed are the Teams and jersey numbers that Forrest McPherson Played: Nebraska Corn Huskers 1930 and 1931, St. Louis / Kansas City Blues 1934, Chicago Bears 1935 Philadelphia Eagles 1935, 1936 and 1937, Wilmington Clippers 1937, Los Angeles Bull Dogs 1938, 1940, 1941, 1942, 1946 and 1947, St Louis Gunners 1939, Los Angeles Mustangs 1943, Green Bay Packers 1943, 1944 and 1945, Hollywood Bears as player and Coach 1945-1948. All League PCFL 1941, 1947. 
List of Jersey Numbers not complete: St Louis /Kansas City Blues #36, Philadelphia Eagles #26 & #35, Chicago Bears #25, St. Louis Gunners #99, Green Bay Packers #72, Los Angeles Bull Dogs # 30 & #32, Hollywood Bears #25. Wilmington Clippers #26 & #30.

References

External links
 pro-football-reference.com
 

Green Bay Packers players
Philadelphia Eagles players
People from Fairbury, Nebraska
Nebraska Cornhuskers football players
1911 births
1989 deaths
Players of American football from Nebraska